Jan Baptist van Deynum, or Duinen (1620–1668), was a Flemish Baroque painter.

Biography
According to Houbraken, who summarized a three-page poem about his work by Cornelis de Bie, Jan Baptist van Deynum was a respected Flemish painter who quit his job as "hopman" of a schutterij in Antwerp in order to have more time for painting. In 1662, his works could be admired in the "Koningshof" in Antwerp.

According to the RKD, he was a portrait painter active in Antwerp.

References

1620 births
1668 deaths
Flemish Baroque painters
Artists from Antwerp